Stad is a municipality in Vestland county, Norway. It is located in the traditional district of Nordfjord. The municipality includes much of the northern shore of the Nordfjorden as well as the Stad peninsula. The administrative centre of the municipality is the village of Nordfjordeid. Other villages in the municipality include Selje, Barmen, Ervik, Flatraket, Hoddevik, Hoddevika, Håvik, Leikanger, Mogrenda, Stårheim, Haugen, Kjølsdalen, Heggjabygda, and Lote.

The  municipality is the 152nd largest by area out of the 356 municipalities in Norway. Stad is the 119th most populous municipality in Norway with a population of 9,527.

The Stad Ship Tunnel is a planned canal and tunnel to bypass the Stad peninsula in Stad Municipality in Vestland county, Norway. When built it will be the first full-size ship tunnel in the world and will allow boats to avoid traveling around the Stad peninsula—a particularly dangerous sea route.

General information
The municipality of Stad was established on 1 January 2020 when Selje Municipality, Eid Municipality, and the Bryggja area of Vågsøy Municipality were merged to form one large municipality.

Name
The municipality is named after the Stad peninsula which is located in the western part of the municipality. The name comes from the old word meaning "halt", possibly because the rough waters around the peninsula often caused seafarers here to wait for better weather.

Coat of arms
The coat of arms was approved on 15 May 2019. The arms are blue and white and show a two-part design with St. Sunniva on the left and a fjord horse on the right. It is a combination of the old arms of the two municipalities of Selje and Eid which were merged to form Stad.  These two figures were chosen because the region is well known for its own race of horses, called the Fjording, that are very common and popular in the area. The Fjording is characterised by its white and black mane.  The woman is a depiction of Saint Sunniva, the royal Irish missionary who died as a martyr on the island of Selja while trying to convert he locals to Christianity. Later, the Selje Abbey was built on the spot where she died. She was later named the patron saint of the Norwegian Diocese of Bjørgvin and all of Western Norway.

Churches
The Church of Norway has six parishes within the municipality of Stad. It is part of the Nordfjord prosti (deanery) in the Diocese of Bjørgvin.

Geography

Stad Municipality is located in the northwesternmost part of Vestland county, in the Nordfjord region. It includes the Stad peninsula and the islands of Barmøya, Venøya, and Selja. The Sildagapet bay, the North Sea, and the Vanylvsfjorden lie on the western sides of the municipality. The Nordfjorden runs along the south side of the municipality. Hornindalsvatnet, the deepest lake in Europe, is partially located in the municipality.

Stad Municipality is bordered to the southwest by Kinn Municipality, to the north by Vanylven Municipality, Sande Municipality, and Volda Municipality (in Møre og Romsdal county). The municipalities of Bremanger and Gloppen lie to the south, across the fjord. Stryn Municipality lies to the east.

Government
All municipalities in Norway, including Stad, are responsible for primary education (through 10th grade), outpatient health services, senior citizen services, unemployment and other social services, zoning, economic development, and municipal roads. The municipality is governed by a municipal council of elected representatives, which in turn elects a mayor.  The municipality falls under the Sogn og Fjordane District Court and the Gulating Court of Appeal.

Municipal council
The municipal council  of Stad is made up of 33 representatives that are elected to four year terms. The party breakdown for the council is as follows:

Notable people 

 Sophus Lie (1842 in Nordfjordeid – 1899) a Norwegian mathematician
 Olav L. Os (1882 in Nordfjordeid – 1953) a politician and silver fox breeder
 Oliver H. Langeland (1887 in Eid – 1958) a military officer, civil servant and leader of Milorg District 13 in WWII
 Kolbjørn Varmann (1904 in Eid – 1980) a priest, politician, Minister of Transport and County Governor of Finnmark
 Sølve Skagen (born 1945 in Eid) a Norwegian film director 
 Åge Starheim (born 1946 in Eid) a Norwegian politician, Mayor of Selje, 1983-1989
 Harald Aabrekk (born 1956 in Nordfjordeid) a Norwegian football coach and a former player
 Brynjar Rasmussen (born 1977 in Nordfjordeid) a Norwegian jazz musician, plays the clarinet
 Azar Karadas (born 1981 in Nordfjordeid) a former footballer with over 400 club caps and 10 for Norway
 Ingrid Thunem (born 1989 in Nordfjordeid) a Paralympic swimmer

References

 
Municipalities of Vestland
2020 establishments in Norway